An Fhairche (locally An Fháirthí), or Clonbur in English, is a Gaeltacht village in Connemara, County Galway, Ireland.

The village of Clonbur sits between Lough Corrib and Lough Mask. Two kilometres to the west rises Mount Gable where, according to legend, the hordes of Firbolg gathered on the hilltop before their clash with the Tuatha Dé Danann at the Battle of Moytura.

Clonbur also contains the ruins of the Petersburg Estate, seat of the Lynch family. In more recent times, it was owned by the Guinness family. The house and yard buildings have been completely renovated and now function as an Outdoor Education Centre.

Geography
Located at the foot of Mount Gable, three miles west of Clonbur in County Galway. Lough Coolin is accessible via the villages of Ballyveane and Kilbeg Upper. Beside the lake are the stone cottage ruins of an old village. The lake was renowned for white trout until the early 1960s when pike were added to the lake by a local fisherman. Pike and perch are now the only fish in the lake. A stream from the Lough Coolin flows into Lough Mask. Coolin Lake provides fresh water for the village of Clonbur.

Features

Ross Hill Abbey
In the Ross Hill cemetery of stands the ruins of Teampall Brendain. The ruin is sited within an ancient oval enclosure known as a Caiseal or Cashel. The western end of the ruin is of early Christian origin and in the trabeated doorway can clearly be seen the inclined jambs so distinctive of that era. This edifice replaced a wooden and less durable structure which was the Navigator's original monastic settlement on the site.

Within 30 meters of the western doorway is a curiosity locally known as The Ogham Stone.
The site, in the Ross Hill estate, was once the property of the unpopular Earl of Leitrim.
The estate later became the property of the Guinness family.

Ballykine (Ballykyne) Castle

One of a series of five fortifications from Ballinrobe to Ballindonage, it was originally owned by the O'Kynes. In 1571 it was seized for the Crown by Fitton, the then President of Connacht. For a period the de Burgos held it and later gave it to the MacDonnells (Scottish mercenaries) as service booty or bonnacht. Eventually it passed from Sir Richard O'Donnell to Sir Benjamin Lee Guinness and so became part of the Guinness estate.

Architecturally, the castle has some puzzling features. The trabeated doorway with its inclined jambs pre-dates the rest of the structure by some 900 years. Certain sections of the stonework are not bonded together as a unit, a feature which suggests later additions to the original building.

Mount Gable
Mount Gable (1370 feet) is a hill which dominates the isthmus between Lough Corrib and Lough Mask and overlooks one of the major routes into Connemara from the east. The starting point for a walk is approximately 2 km from the village of Clonbur. It provides a backdrop for Lough Coolin. Views of both Lough Mask and Lough Corrib can be had from the top of Mount Gable. Mount Gable is accessible through the villages of Ballyveane and Kilbeg Upper.

See also
 Connacht Irish
 List of towns and villages in Ireland

References

External links
 Clonburcloghbrack.ie website

Towns and villages in County Galway
Gaeltacht places in County Galway
Gaeltacht towns and villages